The 2014 Swiss Open Grand Prix Gold was the third grand prix gold and grand prix tournament of the 2014 BWF Grand Prix Gold and Grand Prix. The tournament was held in St. Jakobshalle, Basel, Switzerland from March 11–16, 2014 and had a total purse of $125,000.

Players by nation

Men's singles

Seeds

Finals

Top half

Section 1

Section 2

Section 3

Section 4

Bottom half

Section 5

Section 6

Section 7

Section 8

Women's singles

Seeds

Finals

Top half

Section 1

Section 2

Bottom half

Section 3

Section 4

Men's doubles

Seeds

Finals

Top half

Section 1

Section 2

Bottom half

Section 3

Section 4

Women's doubles

Seeds

Finals

Top half

Section 1

Section 2

Bottom half

Section 3

Section 4

Mixed doubles

Seeds

Finals

Top half

Section 1

Section 2

Bottom half

Section 3

Section 4

References

Swiss Open (badminton)
Swiss Open Grand Prix Gold
Swiss Open Grand Prix Gold
Sports competitions in Basel
BWF Grand Prix Gold and Grand Prix